The CRRC 600 is a high-speed magnetic levitation (maglev) train developed in China. The first trainset was unveiled in July 2021 at the CRRC Qingdao Sifang factory in Qingdao. The train is planned to reach 600km/h, which would make it one of the fastest trains in the world.

Testing of a 2019 prototype maglev EMU began in 2020 on a 1.5km Tongji University in Shanghai, with testing continuing in 2021. Testing the train to its maximum speed would require extension of the test track, as maglev trains are unable to use regular high speed railway tracks.

The trainsets can carry 2 to 10 carriages, with each holding over 100 passengers. The train is expected to enter service in 2025.

See also 

 List of high-speed trains

References 

High-speed trains of China
Electric multiple units of China
Maglev
High-speed rail in China

Experimental and prototype high-speed trains